Blind Spot is a 2015 Chinese suspense thriller film directed by Danny Pang. The film was released on October 23, 2015.

Cast
Marc Ma
Wu Xin
Pan Yueming
Wang Jingchun
Monica Mok
Zhu Yuchen
Timmy Hung
Danny Chan Kwok-kwan

Reception
The film has earned  at the Chinese box office.

References

2010s thriller films
Chinese thriller films
Films directed by Danny Pang
Chinese suspense films
2010s Mandarin-language films